Linhas Aéreas Natal S.A. was a Brazilian airline formed in 1946. In 1950 it was sold to Real Transportes Aéreos.

History
Linhas Aéreas Natal was founded in Juiz de Fora on June 3, 1946 and received authorization to operate on June 30, 1946. It was formed by the businessman Júlio Álvares de Assis with money borrowed from his uncle Theodorico Álvares de Assis. In fact, the name Natal was an acronym of Navegação Aérea Theodorico Álvares. Later, the official name was changed to Navegação Aérea Transamericana Ltda. Services started on December 7, 1946 with four Douglas DC-3 linking São Paulo to Rio de Janeiro and to Campo Grande.

In May 1950 the airline was bought by Real Transportes Aéreos, which by the end of the same year completely absorbed Natal.

Destinations
In 1946 Natal served São Paulo, Rio de Janeiro and Campo Grande.

Fleet

See also
List of defunct airlines of Brazil

References

Defunct airlines of Brazil
Airlines established in 1946
Airlines disestablished in 1950
1946 establishments in Brazil
1950 disestablishments in Brazil
1950 mergers and acquisitions